Bishopmill United Football Club are a Scottish football club from Elgin, Moray. Members of the Scottish Junior Football Association, the club have currently withdrawn from competition. The original Bishopmill Football Club was formed in 1886, however the present Bishopmill United started life in 1906. The club joined the Morayshire Junior League for its second season 1906–07. Most recently based at Pinefield alongside local rivals New Elgin after their previous ground at Deanshaugh was rendered unusable after remedial works. The team colours are navy blue.

League career

Morayshire Junior League: 1906–1914; 1920–1928; 1932–1935; 1946–1968

North Region (North) Section: 1969–2001

North Region, Division One: (West) 2001–2003

North Region, Division Two: 2003–2009

North Region, Division One: 2009–2011

North Region, Division Two: 2011–2013 (Withdrew during 2012–13 season)

Honours
 North Region (North) League champions: 1980–81
 Morayshire Junior League champions: 1910–11, 1911–12, 1912–13, 1913–14, 1923–24
 Gordon Williamson Cup: 1977–78, 1988–89
 Matthew Cup: 1909–10, 1910–11, 1911–12, 1912–13, 1950–51, 1973–74, 1976–77, 1988–89
 Morayshire Junior Cup: 1948–49, 1962–63, 1963–64, 1978–79, 1988–89
 Nicholson Cup: 1911–12, 1923–24, 1934–35, 1977–78, 1978–79, 1990–91
 Tom Gordon Trophy: 1977–78, 1979–80, 1991–92
 Robertson Cup: 1963–64, 1978–79, 1981–82
 North of Scotland (Morayshire) Cup: 1949–50, 1963–64, 1979–80
 Connon Cup: 1951–52, 1959–60, 1962–63, 1975–76, 1977–78, 1983–84, 1990–91, 1994–95
 White Horse Cup: 1949–50, 1951–52, 1963–64
 Scottish Junior Cup (Best Season) 4th Round, 1963–64

References

External links
 Scottish Football Historical Archive
 Bishopmill United at Non-League Scotland

Football in Moray
Football clubs in Scotland
Scottish Junior Football Association clubs
Association football clubs established in 1882
1882 establishments in Scotland
Elgin, Moray